Alfred Avins (1934–1999) was an American lawyer, law professor, and dean.  Born in New York City on June 29, 1934, Avins earned a bachelor's degree from City University of New York, 1954, an Ll.B from Columbia Law School, 1956, his J.D. from the University of Chicago and a Ph.D from the University of Cambridge.  His first book was The Law of AWOL (1957).  He was best known as a staunch opponent of Civil Rights legislation; he was the author of numerous articles that criticized anti-discrimination legislation or sought to limit its scope.  He was also the author of The Reconstruction Amendments' Debates: The Legislative History and Contemporary Debates in Congress on the 13th, 14th, and 15th Amendments (Virginia Commission on Constitutional Government, 1967), which was designed to show the limited scope of the Reconstruction Amendments to support federal anti-discrimination legislation.  It has proven a useful resource for some scholars looking into the history of the Reconstruction Amendments.

Avins also argued in the late 1960s that the draftsmen of the 14th Amendment did not intend to nullify anti-miscegenation laws and to prohibit school segregation and that thus cases such as Brown v. Board of Education were wrongly decided and "stand[] on clay feet." Avins was especially shocked and stunned by the idea that the draftsmen of the 14th Amendment would sub silentio enact such a sweeping and transformational change as the abolition of school segregation without ever mentioning or debating this topic at all during this Amendment's Congressional ratification history.

In the 1970s Avins was a co-founder of the Delaware Law School.  He unsuccessfully sued Delaware Law School in the 1980s.  In 1977 he founded the old District of Columbia Law School, which he moved to Alexandria in 1980, changing its name to Northern Virginia Law School. Issues of accreditation with this school also resulted in unsuccessful litigation in federal court.

Alfred Avins died on May 24, 1999 in Bethesda, Maryland.

References

Columbia Law School alumni
University of Chicago Law School alumni
1935 births
1999 deaths
20th-century American lawyers